Included in this list of Soo Line locomotives are those of the Minneapolis, St. Paul and Sault Ste. Marie Railroad, as well as those of the Wisconsin Central Railway, which it inherited on its lease in 1909. The M.St.P.&S.Ste.M. finally merged the WC and the Duluth, South Shore and Atlantic Railway on December 30, 1961 to form the Soo Line Railroad. The Soo Line later acquired the Milwaukee Road and became part of the Canadian Pacific Railway.

Note that WC locomotives are shown as after they were re-numbered and reclassified into the Soo Line scheme, with WC locomotives having numbers 2000 higher and classes 20 higher than their M.St.P.&S.Ste.M. counterparts.


Steam locomotives 
Soo Line steam locomotives were organized into classes by wheel arrangement.

Class A: 0-4-0
Class A was for the 0-4-0 switcher type.

Class B: 0-6-0
Class B was for the 0-6-0 switcher type.

Class C: 4-4-0
Class C was for the 4-4-0 "American" type.

Class D: 2-6-0
Class D was for the 2-6-0 "Mogul" type.

Class E: 4-6-0
Class E was for the 4-6-0 type."Ten-Wheeler"

Class F: 2-8-0 
Class F was for the 2-8-0 "Consolidation" type.

Class G: 2-10-0
Class G was the 2-10-0 type.

Class H: 4-6-2

Class H covered the 4-6-2 "Pacific" type.

Class J: 2-6-2
Class J comprised 2-6-2 "Prairie" locomotives.

Class K: 4-4-2
Class K comprised 4-4-2 "Atlantic" locomotives.

Class L: 2-8-2

Class L was for 2-8-2 "Mikado" locomotives.

Class N: 4-8-2
Class N comprised 4-8-2 "Mountain" locomotives.

Class O: 4-8-4
Class O were 4-8-4 "Northern" locomotives.

Diesel locomotives

ALCO
 ALCO FA: 22 locomotives (205A+B–211A+B, 2220A+B–2223A+B)
 ALCO S-2: 7 locomotives (2103–2107, 2109–2110)
 ALCO S-4: 1 locomotives (2116)
 ALCO RS-1: 13 locomotives (350–353, 2360–2368), plus 8 from the DSS&A (100–107)
 ALCO RSC-2: 4 locomotives (368–371)
 ALCO RSC-3: 4 locomotives (372–374, 2380)
 ALCO RS-27: 2 locomotives (415–416)

Baldwin
 Baldwin VO-1000: 1 locomotive (310)
 Baldwin DS-4-4-1000: 2 locomotives (311–312)
 Baldwin S-12: 2 locomotives (313–314)
 Baldwin DRS-4-4-1500, 8 locomotives (360–367)
 Baldwin AS-16, 2 locomotives (379–380)
 Baldwin DRS-6-6-1500 4 locomotives (384–387) from the DSS&A (200–203)
 Baldwin AS-616, 8 locomotives (388–395) from the DSS&A (204–211)
 Baldwin DT-6-6-2000 4 locomotives (396–399) from the DSS&A (300–303)

EMD

Switchers
 EMD SW1: 1 locomotive (320)
 EMC NW1A: 3 locomotives (2100–2102), entire production for this model
 EMD NW2: 3 locomotives (300, 301, 2108)
 EMD SW9: 8 locomotives (2111–2115, 2117–2119)
 EMD SW1200: 16 locomotives (321–328, 2120–2127)

Cab units

 EMD F3: 13 locomotives (12 A units: 200A+B–204A+B, 2200A+B, 1 B unit: 2200C)
 EMD F7: 36 locomotives (26 A units: 212A+B–214A+B, 2201A+B–2203A+B, 2224A+B–2230A+B, 10 B units: 2201C–2204C, 500C–503C, 2500C, 2501C)
 EMD FP7: 8 locomotives (500A–503A, 504, 505, 2500A, 2501A)

Hood units

 EMD GP7: 7 locomotives (375–378, 381–383)
 EMD GP9: 45 locomotives (400–414, 550–558, 2400–2413, 2550–2556)
 EMD SD9: 1 locomotive (2381)
 EMD GP30: 22 locomotives (700–721)
 EMD GP35: 10 locomotives (722–731)
 EMD GP40: 4 locomotives (732–735)
 EMD SD40: 21 locomotives (736–756)
 EMD SD40-2: 57 locomotives (757–789, 6600–6623)
 EMD GP38-2: 53 locomotives (4400–4452)
 EMD SD60: 58 locomotives (6000–6057)
 EMD SD60M: 5 locomotives (6058–6062)

Fairbanks-Morse
 FM H-12-44: 5 locomotives (315–319), built 1952 and 1954

General Electric
GE 44-ton: 1 locomotive (330), built 1941
 GE U30C: 10 locomotives (800–809), built 1968

References 
 

 
Soo Line Railroad
Railway locomotive-related lists